Sikh Izhan Nazrel bin Sikh Azman (born 23 March 2002) is a Malaysian professional footballer who plays as a goalkeeper for Malaysia Super League club Negeri Sembilan, on loan from Selangor.

Early life 
Sikh Izhan was born in Seberang Jaya, Penang, Malaysia and is the third child among four sibling.

At the age of five, Sikh Izhan joined Bintang Biru Academy. At the age of ten, he was spotted by while playing in a tournament and invited got him on the Project 2019 team, citing his size. He travel alone by bus from Penang every weekend to train with the team in Bukit Jalil until the age of 12. He was transferred to Malaysia Pahang Sports School at the age of 13 and transferred to the Bukit Jalil Sports School next year. He moved once again at the age of 15 to the Mokhtar Dahari Academy.

Sikh Izhan was part of the national youth squad that won the 2015 Iber Cup in Spain and 2016 SuperMokh Cup. He also was once nominated as the Goalkeeper of the Tournament in the 2016 Elite Cup in France.

Club career

Selangor
On 26 February 2020, Selangor has announced Sikh Izhan as Selangor II new signing. On 13 August 2021, Sikh Izhan made his debut for the first-team at age of 19. He conceded two goals in an away league match against Kedah Darul Aman as Selangor won 2–4.

CF Fuenlabrada trial 
In November 2021, Spanish La Liga 2 side CF Fuenlabrada invited Sikh Izhan to attends trials with the club. In the same month, the club stated that they want to extend the trial period. He trained with both the first team and the under-22 squad during the trial session.

Negeri Sembilan (loan) 

On 18 January 2023, Sikh Izhan joined Negeri Sembilan on a season-long loan.

International career
Sikh Izhan represented the Malaysian at various youth levels. He was part of the 2018 AFC U-16 Championship squad.

Career statistics

Club

References

External links
 

Malaysian footballers
Malaysia international footballers
Malaysia Premier League players
Malaysia Super League players
Selangor FA players
Negeri Sembilan FC players
Living people
2002 births
Association football goalkeepers
People from Penang
Malaysian people of Malay descent